|}

The Prix Renaud du Vivier is a Group 1 hurdle race in France which is open to four-year-old horses. It is run at Auteuil over a distance of 3,900 metres (about 2 miles and  furlongs), and it is scheduled to take place each year in November.  It is the winter championship event for four-year-old hurdlers and is also known as Grande Course de Haies des 4 Ans.
The race was first run in 1986 and is named in honour of Renaud du Vivier de Fay-Solignac (1896-1985) who was President of the Société des Steeple-Chases de France from 1968 to 1977.

Winners

References

France Galop / Racing Post:

 galopp-sieger.de - Prix Renaud du Vivier - Grand Course des Haies des 4 Ans

See also
 List of French jump horse races

Horse races in France